Isla Willard, is an island in the Gulf of California east of the Baja California Peninsula. The island is uninhabited and is part of the Mexicali Municipality.

Biology
Isla Willard has two species of reptile, including Sauromalus ater (Common Chuckwalla) and Uta stansburiana (Common Side-blotched Lizard).

References

http://herpatlas.sdnhm.org/places/overview/isla-willard/121/1/

Islands of Mexicali Municipality
Islands of Baja California
Islands of the Gulf of California
Uninhabited islands of Mexico